The fourth season of the American mystery drama television series Pretty Little Liars began airing on ABC Family on June 11, 2013. The season consisted of 24 episodes, which were filmed between March 14, 2013, and November 2, 2013. The season concluded its broadcast on March 18, 2014.

The season continues from where it left off in the third-season finale, where the girls were rescued from the burning building by who they believe is Alison. The girls begin looking for answers that could lead to Alison's whereabouts while dealing with the aftermath of Detective Wilden's murder and "A" intervening in their personal lives. It introduces new characters to the story, including Detective Gabriel Holbrook and Lieutenant Linda Tanner, played by Sean Faris and Roma Maffia, who are brought in to investigate the deaths of Detective Wilden and Detective Reynolds. Ella Montgomery (Holly Marie Combs) and Byron Montgomery (Chad Lowe) left the main cast.

The fourth season garnered positive reviews from critics and averaged 2.74 million viewers an episode, down from the previous season, and a 1.1 demo rating, even with the previous season. The premiere was watched by 3.37 million viewers while the finale watched by 3.12 million viewers.

Overview
The first half of the fourth season focuses on the aftermath of Detective Darren Wilden's murder. Being last seen with Wilden before his murder, Ashley (Laura Leighton) is made a prime suspect and arrested. The girls work to find out who A is in hopes of finding Wilden's murderer. Meanwhile, Hanna (Ashley Benson) deals with her mother's arrest and trial. Spencer (Troian Bellisario) helps Toby (Keegan Allen) with finding answers about his mother's untimely death while trying to keep him from falling victim to "A"'s schemes. Aria (Lucy Hale) tries to break free from her feelings toward Ezra (Ian Harding) by pursuing a relationship with Jake (Ryan Guzman). Emily (Shay Mitchell) suffers an injury that ends her swim career, which complicates her college application process.

After finding several new clues, the girls believe that Alison may be alive. Towards the middle of the season, they find a connection Alison (Sasha Pieterse) had in Ravenswood and go there to find "A" and Alison. In Ravenswood, Emily is kidnapped and locked in a box on a sawmill by Red Coat. The girls notice Red Coat running to the Sawmill and follow her inside, where she actually saves Emily. At this point, another Red Coat shows up and is unmasked as CeCe Drake (Vanessa Ray), while the other Red Coat, whom they believe is Alison, leads Spencer to an apartment, believed to be owned by "A", where they conclude that "A" is male. They later find Alison's contact, Mrs. Grunwald (Meg Foster), who tells them that Alison is alive. The girls search Ravenswood to find her but she meets them back at Rosewood and is revealed as the "good" Red Coat, telling them she is still in danger, so she can not return until it is safe. Meanwhile, it is revealed that the apartment is owned by Ezra, seemingly revealing that he is "A". 

The second half deals with the girls' attempts to learn more about what happened during the summer, who "A" is, and how to bring Alison home. Meanwhile, Spencer begins taking amphetamines to help cope with the workload from school, but develops a dependency on them, igniting a drug problem that, unbeknownst to the others, occurred before. Aria grows closer to Ezra, whom the other girls believe is "A", but breaks it off after learning that he has actually been writing a book about Alison's disappearance and knew her when they met. Hanna mends her broken heart by pursuing a relationship with Travis (Luke Kleintank) and an interest in mystery novels, which lead to a friendship with Detective Holbrook (Sean Faris). 

Aria tells the girls that Ezra thinks one of them is 'A', but the suspicion later shifted to Jessica Dilaurentis, Alison's mother, after reading more of the notes on Ezra's manuscript. Emily later tells Paige that Alison is alive, and Paige betrays her trust by tipping the police. Suspecting that they can find clues at Ali's house, Hanna volunteers the girls to Jessica's bridal fashion charity show. Once they got into Ali's old room, they found a password to an email address written in a post-it on Ali's money. They contact the number, and Alison calls back, telling them to meet her in Philadelphia. They are met by Noel Kahn who brings the girls to Manhattan. There, Alison recounts the events that happened on the night she disappeared. The girls then try to put the pieces together to figure out who 'A' is. However, a hooded figure - seemingly "A" himself - attacks the girls and corners them on the rooftop with a gun. Ezra suddenly shows up and tries to intervene, but is shot in the ensuing scuffle. The last scene shows Jessica Dilaurentis' lifeless body being dragged across the lawn, before being buried by 'A'.

Cast

Main cast
 Troian Bellisario as Spencer Hastings
 Ashley Benson as Hanna Marin
 Lucy Hale as Aria Montgomery
 Tyler Blackburn as Caleb Rivers1
 Ian Harding as Ezra Fitz
 Shay Mitchell as Emily Fields
 Janel Parrish as Mona Vanderwaal
 Sasha Pieterse as Alison DiLaurentis
 Laura Leighton as Ashley Marin

Recurring cast
 Andrea Parker as Jessica DiLaurentis
 Lesley Fera as Veronica Hastings
 Lindsey Shaw as Paige McCullers
 Sean Faris as Detective Gabriel Holbrook
 Ryan Guzman as Jake
 Cody Allen Christian as Mike Montgomery
 Luke Kleintank as Travis Hobbs
 Aeriél Miranda as Shana Fring
 Nia Peeples as Pam Fields
 Nolan North as Peter Hastings
 Tammin Sursok as Jenna Marshall
 Vanessa Ray as CeCe Drake

Guest cast
 Larisa Oleynik as Maggie Cutler
 Roma Maffia as Lieutenant Linda Tanner
 Torrey DeVitto as Melissa Hastings
 Holly Marie Combs as Ella Montgomery
 Chad Lowe as Byron Montgomery
 Eric Steinberg as Wayne Fields
 John O'Brien as Arthur Hackett
 Meg Foster as Carla Grunwald
 Bryce Johnson as Darren Wilden
 Roark Critchlow as Tom Marin
 Wyatt Nash as Nigel Wright
 Nick Tate as Dr. Louis Palmer
 Wes Ramsey as Jesse Lindall
 Nathaniel Buzolic as Dean Stavros
 Jed Rees as Hector Lime
Joseph Zinsman as Robert Vargas

 Julian Morris as Wren Kingston
 Jim Titus as Barry Maple
 Ryan Merriman as Ian Thomas
 Brant Daugherty as Noel Kahn
 Drew Van Acker as Jason DiLaurentis
 Steve Talley as Zack
 Brandon W. Jones as Andrew Campbell
 Rumer Willis as Zoe
 Nicole Gale Anderson as Miranda Collins
 Brett Dier as Luke Matheson
 Skyler Day as Claire
 Elizabeth Whitson as Leah Matheson
 Mark Schroeder as Brendan McGowen
 Michael Grant as Connor
 Marcia Clark as Sidney Barnes
 Nicole L. Sullivan as Tina
 Rose Abdoo as Dr. Sandy
 Nick Roux as Riley
 Michelle Hurd as Elizabeth Mainway

: Tyler Blackburn is credited as a series regular up until episode 14. From episode 15 onwards he is no longer credited.

Episodes

Specials

Reception
The fourth season garnered positive reviews from critics. It earned a 100% approval rating on Rotten Tomatoes, with an average rating of 7.1 out of 10. Mark Trammell of TV Equals commented on "how savvy the show was this time around." Caroline Framke of The A.V. Club commented on how the show's focus on shocking moments are more appealing than big picture, writing "It might have been fun at one point, but trying to keep track of who's in or out with A is an exhausting exercise that rarely yields satisfying results anymore". Framke commented further "But the thing about Pretty Little Liars is that when it's good, it is a fever dream. It's at its most fun when it breezes past the big picture, gets lost in its own illusions, and lets a talking parrot steal the spotlight."

Ratings

Live + SD ratings

DVD release

References

2013 American television seasons
2014 American television seasons
Pretty Little Liars (franchise)